Hans Holtermann (c. 1709 – 1781), also known as Hans Henrik Holtermann or Hans Henriksen Holtermann, was a Norwegian businessman and landowner.

Biography
Hans Holtermann was from a family of traders and whole merchants on the west coast of Norway.  Holtermann's great-grandfather, Coert Holtermann, is believed to have first immigrated from Rothenburg in Germany  to Bergen  with his son Henrich Holtermann (1650-1730). They acquired citizenship in 1676 and became involved in trading. Hans Holtermann's father, Henrik Holtermann (1683-1728), acquired trading rights in Bergen. At that time there was no market town (kjobstad)  in Sunnmøre  and the Holtermans extended their privileges to Borgund and set up a trading post at Brunholmen that eventually became the nucleus of the town of Ålesund. Hans Holtermann operated as a trader in Molde and later at Vegsund in Borgund (now Ålesund). He may also have introduced dried and salted cod (klippfisk) production and trade to the area.  

His first marriage was to Margaretha Knudsdatter Wiig (from Vik in Ørsta, 1692–1743). His  second marriage was to Ingeborg Catharine (a.k.a. Cathrina, Cathrine) Hagerup (August 30, 1730 – 1796), the daughter of Bishop Eiler Hagerup. Holtermann was the brother-in-law of the magistrate Melchior Falch, who was married to a younger daughter of Bishop Hagerup. His son, Knut Holtermann, became a supreme court judge in Copenhagen (then also the capital of Norway).

Hans Holtermann purchased parts of the Giske estate circa 1750, and in 1760 Austrått manor in Ørland. Holtermann is believed to have paid 26,000 riksdaler for Austrått. The Austrått manor also included part or full ownership of a large number of smaller farms in the Ørland region. Hans Holtermann hosted Christian VI of Denmark on the King's famous journey through Norway in 1733. 

Upon purchasing the Giske estate (Giskegodset), Holtermann had also become the owner of Giske Church, and together with Hans Strøm he carried out a major restoration of the dilapidated building. 
After the restoration, Hans Strøm had an epitaph written, including the following praise of Holtermann: Sikkert var gudshuset faldt, / glemt som det var alverden, / hadde ei Holtermann faat, / den gjæve eier og værge, / reist dig til fordums magt. / Og kongen har arbeidet bifaldt. / Nu, o kirke, vil du, / frelst kunne synge Guds pris. (Certainly this house of worship fell, / Forgotten by the whole world, / A Holtermann received it, / A princely owner and guardian, / And raised thee to thy former might. / And the king approved of the work. / Now, oh Church, saved, / May you sing God's praises.)

References 

Norwegian businesspeople
People from Møre og Romsdal
Norwegian landowners
1781 deaths
1709 births
Norwegian people of German descent